The Lucanidae are a family of beetles that include the stag beetles. The family can be further subdivided in a taxonomy. The classification presented here follows Smith (2006), with the exception of the tribal classification within the Lucaninae.

Subfamily Aesalinae

Subfamily Aesalinae
Tribe Aesalini
Genus Aesalus (Fabricius, 1801)
Aesalus asiaticus Lewis, 1883
Aesalus himalayicus Kurosawa, 1985
Aesalus imanishii Inahara & Ratti, 1991
Aesalus meridionalis Bartolozzi, 1989
Aesalus neotropicalis Bates, 1886
Aesalus saburoi
Aesalus sawaii Fujita & Ichikawa, 1985
Aesalus scarabaeoides Panzer, 1793
Aesalus sichuanensis
Aesalus smithi Bates, 1889
Aesalus trogoides Albers, 1883
Aesalus ulanowskii Ganglbauer, 1886
Genus Cretaesalus (fossil)
Genus Echinoaesalus Zelenka, 1993
Echinoaesalus barriesi (Zelenka, 1993)
Echinoaesalus hidakai (Araya, 1993)
Echinoaesalus jaechi (Zelenka,1993)
Echinoaesalus matsuii (Araya, 1993)
Echinoaesalus sabahensis (Zelenka, 1994)
Echinoaesalus schuhi (Zelenka, 1994)
Echinoaesalus timidus (Krikken, 1975)
Echinoaesalus yongi (Araya, 1993)
Genus Lucanobium Howden & Lawrence, 1974
Lucanobium squamosum Howden & Lawrence, 1974
Tribe Ceratognathini
Genus Ceratognathus Westwood, 1838
Ceratognathus abdominalis Parry, 1870
Ceratognathus bitumulatus Carter, 1925
Ceratognathus flabellatus Boileau, 1905
Ceratognathus frenchi Blackburn, 1897
Ceratognathus froggatti Blackburn, 1894
Ceratognathus gilesi Blackburn, 1895
Ceratognathus macrognathus Boileau, 1905
Ceratognathus mentiferus Westwood, 1863
Ceratognathus minutus Lea, 1929
Ceratognathus niger Westwood, 1838
Ceratognathus ocularis Carter, 1925
Ceratognathus rufipennis Westwood, 1872
Ceratognathus tasmanus Benesh, 1943
Ceratognathus westwoodi Thomson, 1862
Genus Hilophyllus Paulsen & Mondaca, 2006
Hilophyllus argentinensis (Martinez, 1981)
Hilophyllus martinezi Paulsen & Mondaca, 2006
Hilophyllus penai (Martinez, 1976)
Genus Mitophyllus Parry, 1843
Mitophyllus alboguttatus (Bates, 1867)
Mitophyllus dispar (Sharp, 1882)
Mitophyllus foveolatus (Broun, 1880)
Mitophyllus gibbosus (Broun, 1884)
Mitophyllus insignis Broun, 1921
Mitophyllus irroratus Parry, 1842
Mitophyllus macrocerus (Broun, 1886)
Mitophyllus parrianus Westwood, 1863
Mitophyllus reflexus Broun, 1908
Tribe Nicagini
Genus Nicagus LeConte, 1861
Nicagus obscurus (LeConte, 1848)
Nicagus occultus Paulsen & Smith, 2005
Nicagus japonicus Nagel, 1928
Genus Holloceratognathus Nikolajev, 1998
Holloceratognathus cylindricus (Broun, 1895)
Holloceratognathus helotoides (Thomson, 1862)
Holloceratognathus passaliformis (Holloway, 1962)

Subfamily Lampriminae

Subfamily Lampriminae
Genus Dendroblax White, 1846
Dendroblax earlianus White, 1846
Genus Homolamprima
Homolamprima crenulata (MacLeay, 1885)
Genus Lamprima
Lamprima adolphinae (Gestro, 1875)
Lamprima aenea Fabricius, 1792
Lamprima aurata Latreille, 1817
Lamprima imberbis Barber, 1926
Lamprima insularis Macleay, 1885
Genus Phalacrognathus
Phalacrognathus muelleri MacLeay, 1885
Genus Streptocerus Dejean, 1833
Streptocerus speciosus Fairmaire, 1850

Subfamily Lucaninae

Subfamily Lucaninae Latreille, 1804
Tribe Aegini
Genus Aegus MacLeay, 1819
Tribe Allotopini
Genus Allotopus
Allotopus moellenkampi (Fruhstorfer, 1894)
Allotopus rosenbergi (Vollenhoven, 1872)
Genus Mesotopus
Tribe Chiasognathini
Genus Casignetus
Genus Chiasognathus Stephens, 1831
Chiasognathus beneshi Lacroix, 1978
Chiasognathus grantii Stephens, 1831
Chiasognathus jousselini Reiche, 1850
Chiasognathus latreillei Solier, 1851
Chiasognathus mniszechii Kiesche 1919
Genus Protognathinus
Genus Sphaenognathus
Tribe Cladognathini
Genus Aphanognathus
Aphanognathus laterotarsoides (Houlbert, 1915)
Genus Capreolucanus
Capreolucanus sicardi Didier, 1928
Genus Cladophyllus
Genus Eligmodontus
Genus Gonometopus
Genus Macrodorcas Motschulsky, 1862
Macrodorcas adachii
Macrodorcas amamiana
Macrodorcas barbata
Macrodorcas bisignata
Macrodorcas bomansi
Macrodorcas davidi
Macrodorcas dierli
Macrodorcas elsiledis
Macrodorcas fulvonotata
Macrodorcas humilis
Macrodorcas intricata
Macrodorcas kobayashii
Macrodorcas koyamai
Macrodorcas melliana
Macrodorcas mochizukii
Macrodorcas moellenkampi
Macrodorcas montivaga
Macrodorcas pieli
Macrodorcas pseudaxis
Macrodorcas recta Motschulsky, 1858
Macrodorcas ruficrus
Macrodorcas songiana
Macrodorcas striatipennis Motschulsky, 1862
Macrodorcas ursulae
Macrodorcas vernicata
Macrodorcas yaeyamaensis
Genus Palaeognathus
Genus Prismognathus Motschulsky, 1860
Prismognathus alessandrae
Prismognathus angularis Waterhouse, 1874
Prismognathus branczicki
Prismognathus cheni
Prismognathus dauricus Motschulsky, 1860
Prismognathus davidis
Prismognathus delislei
Prismognathus formosanus
Prismognathus klapperichi
Prismognathus lucidus
Prismognathus morimotoi
Prismognathus nigerrimus
Prismognathus nigricolor
Prismognathus piluensis
Prismognathus platycephalus
Prismognathus ruficephalus
Prismognathus sinensis
Prismognathus subnitens
Prismognathus tokui
Genus Prosopocoilus Westwood, 1845
Genus Pseudorhaetus
Genus Rhaetulus
Genus Rhaetus
Rhaetus westwoodi (Parry, 1862)
Genus Tetrarthrius
Genus Weinreichius
Weinreichius perroti Lacroix, 1978
Tribe Colophonini
Genus Colophon
Tribe Cyclommatini
Genus Cyclommatus Parry, 1863
Tribe Dendeziini
Genus Dendezia
Genus Oonotus Parry, 1864
Genus Xiphodontus
Tribe Dorcini
Genus Bartolozziolucanus
Genus Cantharolethrus
Cantharolethrus luxeri
Genus Cyclommatus
Cyclommatus scutellaris
Genus Dorcasoides
Genus Dorcus MacLeay, 1819
Dorcus akahorii
Dorcus alcides
Dorcus alexisi
Dorcus amamianus
Dorcus antaeus
Dorcus anteus
Dorcus arfakianus
Dorcus binodulosus
Dorcus brevis
Dorcus bucephalus
Dorcus carinulatus
Dorcus consentaneus
Dorcus curvidens
Dorcus cylindricus
Dorcus davidis
Dorcus emikoae
Dorcus eurycephalus
Dorcus formosanus
Dorcus gracilicornis
Dorcus garndis
Dorcus hopei
Dorcus hyperion
Dorcus japonicus
Dorcus kyanrauensis
Dorcus metacostatus
Dorcus miwai
Dorcus musimon
Dorcus parallelus
Dorcus parallelipipedus - lesser stag beetle. Linnaeus, 1758
Dorcus parryi
Dorcus parvulus
Dorcus peyronis
Dorcus prochazkai
Dorcus ratiocinativus
Dorcus rectus
Dorcus reichei
Dorcus rudis
Dorcus sawaii
Dorcus schenklingi
Dorcus sewertzowi
Dorcus suturalis
Dorcus taiwanicus
Dorcus tanakai
Dorcus taurus
Dorcus tenuecostatus
Dorcus titanus
Dorcus tormosanus
Dorcus ursulus
Dorcus vavrai
Dorcus velutinus
Dorcus vicinus
Dorcus yamadai
Genus Homoderus
Genus Leptinopterus
Genus Prosopocoilus
Prosopocoilus astacoides
Prosopocoilus biplagiatus
Prosopocoilus bison
Prosopocoilus giraffa
Prosopocoilus inclinatus
Prosopocoilus savagei
Genus Rhaetulus
Rhaetulus crenatus
Genus Serrognathus
Genus Pycnosiphorus
Genus Sclerostomus
Tribe Figulini
Genus Cardanus
Genus Dinonigidius
Genus Figulus
Genus Ganelius
Genus Nigidionus
Genus Nigidius
Genus Novonigidius
Genus Penichrolucanus
Tribe Lissapterini
Genus Bomansius
Genus Dorculus
Genus Geodorcus
Genus Hoplogonus
Genus Lissapterus
Genus Lissotes
Genus Paralissotes
Genus Pseudodorcus
Tribe Lucanini
Genus Hexarthrius Hope, 1842
Hexarthrius aduncusJordan & Rothschild, 1894 
Hexarthrius andreasi Schenk, 2003
Hexarthrius bowringii Parry, 1862
Hexarthrius buquettii (Hope, 1843)
Hexarthrius davisoniWaterhouse, 1888
Hexarthrius forsteri (Hope, 1840)
Hexarthrius howdeni De Lisle, 1972
Hexarthrius kirchneri Schenk, 2003
Hexarthrius mandibularis Deyrolle, 1881
Hexarthrius melchioritis Séguy, 1954  
Hexarthrius mniszechi(Thomson, 1857)
Hexarthrius nigritus Lacroix, 1990
Hexarthrius parryi Hope, 1842
Hexarthrius rhinoceros(Olivier, 1789)
Hexarthrius vitalisi Didier, 1925
Genus Lucanus
Lucanus capreolus
Lucanus cervus
Lucanus elaphus
Lucanus formosanus
Lucanus maculifemoratus
Lucanus mazama
Lucanus placidus
Lucanus swinhoei
Lucanus tetraodon
Genus Pseudolucanus
Pseudolucanus barbarossa (Fabricius, 1801)
Tribe Odontolabini
Genus Calcodes
Genus Neolucanus
Neolucanus castanopterus
Genus Odontolabis
Odontolabis castelnaudi
Odontolabis cuvera
Odontolabis femoralis
Odontolabis siva
Tribe Platycerini
Genus Platyceroides Benesh, 1946
Genus Platyceropsis Benesh, 1946 
Platyceropsis keeni (Casey, 1895)
Genus Platycerus Geoffroy, 1762
Tribe Ryssonotini
Genus Cacostomus
Cacostomus floralis (Lea, 1914)
Cacostomus squamosus Newman, 1840
Cacostomus subvittata (Moore, 1994)
Genus Ryssonotus

Subfamily Syndesinae

Subfamily Syndesinae
Tribe Ceruchini
Genus Ceruchus MacLeay, 1819
Ceruchus piceus (Weber, 1801)
Ceruchus punctatus LeConte, 1869
Ceruchus striatus LeConte, 1859
Ceruchus yangi Huang, Imura & Chen, 2011
Tribe Sinodendronini
Genus Sinodendron Hellwig in Schneider, 1792
Sinodendron cylindricum (Linnaeus, 1758)
Sinodendron rugosum Mannerheim, 1843
Tribe Syndesini
Genus Psilodon Perty, 1830
Psilodon aequinoctiale (Buquet, 1840)
Psilodon gilberti Boucher, 1993
Psilodon schuberti Perty, 1830
Psilodon seguyi (Didier, 1929) 
Psilodon xerophilicum Martinez & Reyes-Castillo, 1985 
Genus Syndesus MacLeay, 1819
†Syndesus ambericus Woodruff, 2009 (Miocene?; Dominican amber)
Syndesus cancellatus Montrouzier, 1860 
Syndesus cornutus (Fabricius, 1801) 
Syndesus macleayi Boileau, 1905

References 

Lucanidae
Lucanidae